Dubai is a city of the United Arab Emirates. The aforementioned linked article refers the reader to the city.

Dubai may also refer to:
 Emirate of Dubai, the emirate of the United Arab Emirates
 Dubai (2001 film), a Malayalam film
 Dubai (2005 film), a Filipino film
 Dubai (wrestler), a ring name for American professional wrestler Dara Daivari
 Dubai (yacht), a yacht
 Dubai (typeface), a font commissioned by the Government of Dubai
 Dubai, Unnao, a village in Uttar Pradesh, India

See also